The Pittsburgh Mayoral Chief of Staff is the senior advisor, strategic planner and "gatekeeper" to the Mayor of Pittsburgh of Pittsburgh, Pennsylvania.

Jake Wheatley 2020-present (serving Ed Gainey)
Dan Gilman 2018–2020 (serving Bill Peduto)
Kevin Acklin 2014-2018 (serving Bill Peduto)
Yarone Zober 2006-2014 (serving Luke Ravenstahl)
Dick Skrinjar 2006 (serving Bob O'Connor)
Sal Sirabella 1994-2003 (serving Thomas J. Murphy 
Tom Cox 1994-2006 (serving Thomas J. Murphy, Jr.)
George Whitmer ?-1994 (serving Sophie Masloff)
Joe Mistick 1989-? (serving Sophie Masloff)
George Jacoby 1986-1989 (serving Richard Caliguiri & Sophie Masloff)
David Donahoe 1985-1986 (serving Richard Caliguiri)

David Matter 1977-1985 (serving Richard Caliguiri)

Bruce Campbell 1970-1977 (serving Peter F. Flaherty)
Burrell Cohen ?-November 27, 1968 (serving Joseph M. Barr)
David Kurtzman ?-1959 (serving David L. Lawrence)
John P. Robin ?-1955 (serving Con Scully & David Lawrence)

References
Pittsburgh Post-Gazette Article

Government of Pittsburgh
History of Pittsburgh